The Garlandstone is a gaff-rigged sailing Tamar Ketch, built in Calstock in Cornwall, England, and launched on 27 January 1909. It was built by James Goss on speculation at the foot of Calstock Viaduct. She was designed for transporting goods between Great Britain and Ireland.

Commercial activity
She was designed for transporting goods between Great Britain and Ireland, via the Celtic Sea and rivers of the South West England, in particular the River Tamar and the River Severn. She also regularly sailed between Lisbon and Calstock, notably supplying fresh fruit to the townspeople.

During the Great War she took an active part ferrying munitions across the Irish Sea.

Redundancy
In 1961 the vessel fell out of use and was donated to the National Maritime Museum in Wales. She remained along the quayside wall at Porthmadog, in North Wales until she was finally towed back to the river of her origin, the River Tamar.

Restoration
Restoration work began in 1990 funded by the National Heritage Lottery. In 1996 the ship was registered as a ship of the National Historic Fleet. The restoration was completed at Morwellham Quay in 2000 and she was recommissioned. Since then the ship has been used as a static museum at Morwellham and due to lack of use has fallen into a state of disrepair. In late 2010, there was a public appeal for the restoration of the ship, but no restoration took place.

Gallery

See also
 West Country Ketch
 Calstock
 Morwellham Quay

References

Individual sailing vessels
Sailing ships of the United Kingdom
1909 ships
Calstock
River Tamar
Ships and vessels on the National Register of Historic Vessels
World War I merchant ships of the United Kingdom
Tall ships of the United Kingdom
Ships of the United Kingdom
Ships of England
Merchant ships of the United Kingdom
Merchant ships of England